

Wolfgang von Chamier-Glisczinski (16 April 1894 – 22 August 1943) was a German general during World War II. He was a recipient of the Knight's Cross of the Iron Cross of Nazi Germany. Chamier-Glisczinski died  on 22 August 1943 when his airplane crashed near Sisak, Croatia. He was posthumously promoted to Generalleutnant.

Awards and decorations

 Knight's Cross of the Iron Cross on 6 October 1940 as Oberst and Geschwaderkommodore of Kampfgeschwader 3

References

Citations

Bibliography

 

1894 births
1943 deaths
People from Hagen
Luftwaffe World War II generals
People from the Province of Westphalia
Recipients of the clasp to the Iron Cross, 1st class
Recipients of the Knight's Cross of the Iron Cross
Victims of aviation accidents or incidents in Croatia
German prisoners of war in World War I
World War I prisoners of war held by France
Reichswehr personnel
Prussian Army personnel
Victims of aviation accidents or incidents in Yugoslavia
Lieutenant generals of the Luftwaffe
Military personnel from North Rhine-Westphalia
German Army personnel of World War I